Waters Building may refer to:

Waters Building (Birmingham, Alabama), listed on the National Register of Historic Places in Jefferson County, Alabama
Waters Building (Grand Rapids, Michigan), listed on the National Register of Historic Places in Kent County, Michigan

See also
Waters House (disambiguation)